Anthony or Tony Marshall may refer to:

 Anthony Marshall (American football) (born 1970), former American football cornerback
 Anthony Marshall (cricketer) (1932–1988), English cricketer
 Anthony Dryden Marshall (1924–2014), American producer
 Anthony Marshall (basketball) (born 1991), American basketball player
 Anthony W. Marshall (1906–1999), American television producer
 Tony Marshall (singer) (1938–2023), German Schlager singer
 Tony Marshall (actor) (born 1964), English actor

See also
 Anthony Martial (born 1995), French footballer
 Tonie Marshall (1951–2020), French-American actress, screenwriter, and film director